100% Love can refer to:

 100% Love (2011 film), a 2011 Telugu film
 100% Love (soundtrack), soundtrack to the 2011 film
 100% Love (2012 film), a 2012 Bengali film
 100% Kadhal (English: 100% Love), a remake of the Telugu film, a Tamil romantic-comedy film (filming began 2017}